Gulu Water Supply and Sanitation Project (GWSSP), also Gulu Water Supply and Sewerage System, is a water intake, purification, distribution and waste water collection and disposal system in the city of Gulu, the largest urban centre in the Northern Region of Uganda. In October 2020, the Uganda government concluded Phase 1 of the improvement of water supply and sanitation in the city, with funding from the World Bank, KfW and the Government of Uganda. Phase 2 improvements are expected to start in 2021, with funding from the World Bank, KfW and the  Commonwealth Development Corporation (CDC Group).

Location

Overview
Prior to becoming a city, Gulu depended on one dam on the Oyitino River (Oyitino I), for its source of water. However, due to a prolonged dry spell, the dam became insufficient to supply the needs of a growing city and its metropolitan area. 

As part of efforts to avail adequate potable water to  Gulu and its metropolis, the government of Uganda, together with other development partners, devised the Gulu Water Supply And Sanitation Project. It is divided into two phases, Phase I and Phase II. The total budgeted cost of both phases is US$46 million (USh:170 billion). In March 2022, that budget was increased to $75 million (UGX:269 billion).

Phase 1

Phase 1 was executed between 2017 and 2020. The borehole is fitted with electric pumps that pump the new water directly to storage reservoirs in some neighborhoods in Gulu City, including (a) Senior Quarters (b) Kitgum Road and (c) Alur Road, among others.

The second item in Phase I is the construction of another dam on the Oyitino River (Oyitino II). New intake pipes were laid down to evacuate raw water from both dams and carry it  to the water treatment plant in the neighborhood called Kabedopong. The intake of raw water from Oyitino I and Oyitino II was synchronized and fitted with a new 400 kVA electric generator.

Another component of Phase I, is the building of a new sewage treatment plant in a neighborhood of Gulu called Cubu. New sewage piping to 200 new connections expanded the waste collection and disposal system in the city. Forty-two new public toilets were constructed, capable of accommodating 250 individuals at the same time. Phase I improvements cost US$23.5 million (USh:82.3 billion).

Phase 2

Phase II improvements started in 2021 and are expected to conclude in 2024. These involve the laying on a raw water intake pipe off the Victoria Nile in Oyam District, to a new water treatment plant in Karuma. A new water purification plant will be built in Karuma, close to the raw water intake location. Each jurisdiction that the treated water pipeline traverses will share in the purified water.

In February 2022, Sogea-Satom, a subsidiary of the conglomerate Vinci SA of France, signed an agreement to carry out the implementation of this phase. Under the contract signed with NWSC, the French company committed to undertake the following (a) install electromechanical equipment with capacity
to pump  of raw water per day on the Victoria Nile River, in the vicinity of Karuma (b) build a water purification plant at Karuma, that can produce 30,000m3 of potable water per day. The purification plant will have a storage reservoir "for storing drinking water".

Other commitments include (c) construction of a drying facility for the sludge at the existing wastewater treatment plant in Gulu.

This water infrastructure and sanitation project will benefit towns and communities along a  corridor, between Karuma and Gulu, including: Kamdini, Koro Abili, Karuma, Bobi, Palenga and Minakuru. NWSC estimates that the project will benefit nearly 490,000 people in these small urban centres. In March 2022, another €26 million (UGX:94 billion), sourced from the World Bank, Kfw and the Ugandan Treasury, was injected into the second phase of this project.

Ownership
The Gulu water treatment facilities and sewage treatment and disposal system are wholly owned by the Government of Uganda, through the Uganda Ministry of Water and Environment. The facilities are operated and maintained by National Water and Sewerage Corporation, a government parastatal company, responsible for provision of potable water and sewerage services nationwide.

See also
 Ministry of Water and Environment (Uganda)
 Busia Water Supply and Sanitation Project
 Rukungiri Water Supply and Sanitation Project

References

External links
 Website of National Water & Sewerage Corporation
 Website of Ministry of Water and Environment (Uganda)
 NWSC moves to solve water shortage in Gulu Municipality As of 6 December 2018.

Buildings and structures in Uganda
Gulu
Gulu District
Water resources management
Northern Region, Uganda